Pyrgulopsis sanchezi, is a species of minute freshwater snails with an operculum, aquatic gastropod molluscs or micromolluscs in the family Hydrobiidae.

This species is endemic to the Amargosa River basin in California and Nevada, United States.  Its natural habitat is springs.

Description
It has a short, strongly tapering penial filament that differentiates it from other Pyrgulopsis.

Etymology
The species is named for Peter G. Sanchez, former Resource Management Specialist for Death Valley National Park, who was instrumental in efforts to protect and conserve regional springsnails and their associated aquatic habitats.

References

 

Molluscs of the United States
sanchezi
Gastropods described in 2013